The Colorado College Tigers football team represented Colorado College. The team was discontinued in 2008. It last competed at the NCAA Division III level.

History
The team first competed on Christmas Day, 1882. The 1910 team went undefeated. In 1928, Dutch Clark was the first All-American from Colorado.

Championships

Conference championships

† Co-champions

Playoffs

NCAA Division III
The Tigers made one appearance in the NCAA Division III football playoffs. Their combined record was 0–1.

References

 
American football teams established in 1882
American football teams disestablished in 2008
1882 establishments in Colorado
2008 disestablishments in Colorado